was a private junior college in the city of Seto, Aichi Prefecture, Japan.

History 
It was chartered as a junior college in 1970. In 2005 the college was discontinued. The junior college was one of the schools in Nanzan Gakuen.

References

External links 
 Official website

Educational institutions established in 1970
Japanese junior colleges
Universities and colleges in Aichi Prefecture
Private universities and colleges in Japan
2005 disestablishments in Japan